The Coordinator of Government Activities in the Territories (COGAT) is a unit in the Israeli Ministry of Defense that engages in coordinating civilian issues between the Government of Israel, the Israel Defense Forces, international organizations, diplomats, and the Palestinian Authority. It is the main organ, remaining of the mostly defunct Israeli Civil Administration, which had governed the West Bank and the Gaza Strip between 1981 and 1994.

COGAT is responsible for implementing the Israeli government's policy in the Area C of the West Bank and vis-à-vis the Gaza Strip. In addition, COGAT constitutes the civilian authority for residential zoning and infrastructure and is responsible for addressing the needs of Israeli settlements in the West Bank. The Unit constitutes a focal point of knowledge that combines human quality and advanced technology. It coordinates the activities of government departments, I.D.F and security forces vis-à-vis the Palestinians in the West Bank and the Gaza Strip.

Unit Goals
The Unit's mission is to promote and implement the policy of the Israeli Government in civilian matters, to facilitate humanitarian issues and economic and infrastructure projects in Palestinian controlled areas of the West Bank and in the Gaza Strip. In addition, the unit leads the coordination and liaison with the Palestinian Authority and with the Palestinian population of the West Bank and the Gaza Strip.

As part of its activities with the international community, the unit facilitates the activities of international organizations active in the West Bank and the Gaza Strip including in matters pertaining to infrastructure, education, health and housing projects and the implementation of humanitarian aid programs.

Through the Coordination and Liaison School, the Coordinator of Government Activities in the Territories also oversee the instruction of Arabic in the IDF and other various security organizations and makes sure that the civilian component is addressed in the training of IDF commanders.

Structure
The unit is composed of the following:

Headquarters
COGAT's headquarters are in the Kirya compound in Tel Aviv. The unit headed by the Coordinator of Government Activities in the Territories, Major-General Yoav Mordechai.
Also under the responsibility of the Tel Aviv office is the School for Communication and Coordination, which instructs officers and soldiers in foreign relations, Middle Eastern studies, and spoken Arabic.

West Bank
The West Bank branch of COGAT has its headquarters in Beit El, and is headed by Brigadier-General David Menachem. 
The C.A. has District Coordination Liaison Offices (DCL) in each of the major districts of the West Bank, and one for the Jerusalem periphery area. The offices are in the cities of Jenin, Nablus, Tulkarm, Qalqilyah, Ramallah, Jerusalem Periphery, Bethlehem, Hebron, and Jericho.
The headquarters has branches for dealing with various issues. Each of these branches is headed by a Lieutenant-Colonel.
The Foreign Relations and International Organizations, responsible for coordinating activities of international organizations.
The Economics Branch in charge of coordinating economic and business issues.
The Spokespersonship and Public Relations Office, in-charge of public communication and other publications.
The Infrastructure Branch, responsible for coordinating infrastructure-related activities: water, sewage, electricity, communications, construction, and so on, including the building of the Security Barrier.
Each of the DCLs has officers representing each of the branches in the field and deal with the day-to-day business the Palestinians have (obtaining entry permits to Israel, etc.)

Gaza Strip
Ever since the Disengagement, Israeli COGAT activity with regards to the Gaza Strip is carried out by the Coordination and Liaison Administration of the Gaza Strip (headed by a Colonel). The C.L.A is located outside of the Gaza Strip adjacent to the Erez Crossing. The C.L.A is the military unit responsible to coordinate access to and from the Gaza Strip, facilitate activities of the International community and facilitate civilian and humanitarian needs and requirements of the Palestinian population of the Gaza Strip with regard to Israel.

See also

 Public diplomacy of Israel
 Israeli Defense Forces

References

External links
Increased humanitarian aid to Gaza after IDF operation
COGAT – Summary of humanitarian aid to Gaza 2009

Military units and formations of Israel
Foreign relations of the State of Palestine
Ministry of Defense (Israel)